The 2011–12 Spartan South Midlands Football League season is the 15th in the history of Spartan South Midlands Football League a football competition in England.

Premier Division

The Premier Division featured 20 clubs which competed in the division last season, along with two clubs promoted from Division One:

AFC Dunstable
Berkhamsted

Also, Kingsbury London Tigers changed name to London Tigers.

League table

Division One

Division One featured 18 clubs which competed in the division last season, along with four new clubs:

Chesham United Reserves, joined from the Suburban League
Kentish Town, relegated from the Premier Division
Langford, relegated from the Premier Division
Tokyngton Manor, joined from Hayes Middlesex Sunday League

League table

Division Two

Division Two featured 13 clubs which competed in the division last season, along with one new club:
Hale Leys United, joined from the North Bucks & District League

League table

References

External links
 Spartan South Midlands Football League

2011-12
9